Peg Woffington (1720–1760), was a British actress and socialite of the Georgian era.

Peg Woffington may also refer to:

 Peg Woffington (1910 film), an American silent historical film
 Peg Woffington (1912 film), a British silent historical film
 Peg Woffington (novel), an 1853 novel by Charles Reade